Diamond Reo Trucks was an American truck manufacturer. In 1967, Diamond T and Reo Trucks were combined to form the Diamond Reo Trucks Division of the White Motor Corporation. Reo dated back to 1904 when Ransom E. Olds, founder of  Oldsmobile, began building motor cars, and Diamond T dated back to 1905 when C.A. Tilt began building vehicles.

In 1971, Francis L. Cappaert of Birmingham, Alabama, bought Diamond Reo from White and formed an independent company called Diamond Reo Trucks Inc. And, at about the same time the Diamond Reo C-116 series was introduced, which featured Cummins NTC-335, NTC-350, NTA-370 and Detroit Diesel 12V-71N engines. Despite new model introductions and excellent reputation Diamond Reo was forced into bankruptcy on December 6, 1974.

One year later Loyal Osterlund and partner Ray Houseal bought the rights to Diamond Reo trucks and made room to continue production in their Harrisburg, Pennsylvania, facility, originally a dealership and maintenance facility. The single model C-116 Giant was continued in production with the Cummins NTC-290 diesel engine as standard power.  Production for 1978 was 131 units.  By 1985, the Harrisburg plant was expanded to be able to produce 10 trucks per day, although output continued at about two per day. The company continued to build about 150 Class 8 trucks annually through 1995 all as Diamond Vehicle Solutions LLC.

In the early 2000s Diamond Vehicle Solutions marketed the T-Line series described as "a blend of vintage Diamond T heritage and modern engineering" The T-Line's series included one long-nose and two medium-nose models with the company manufacturing frames and other parts, and outfits basic cabs it obtains from Navistar; it offered Caterpillar and Cummins diesels, Eaton and Allison transmissions, and Dana and Meritor axles. These trucks were manufactured until 2010 with parts manufacturing lasting until 2013.

Recent developments
Diamond Vehicle Solutions is now doing business as T-Line Trucks & Chassis; and in May 2015, T-Line announced that it intended to resume production of Class 6, 7, and 8 trucks and tractors, mostly for vocational use. T-Line will also produce glider kits and complete "made-to-order" trucks.

Original (1967 - 1974) Diamond Reo truck series

Conventional
C-990
C-90 and C-90D
C-92 "Apollo"
C-101 and DC-101 "Apollo"
C-114
C-116 "Apollo"
C-119 "Raider"

Cabover
CO-50 without sleeper and CO-78 with sleeper
CO-54 and CO-88 "Royale"
"Royale II"

Inter-City Service
CF-55
CF-59
CF-65
CF-83
"The Rogue"

References

Steamcar history
"American Truck & Bus Spotter's Guide: 1920-1985," by Tad Burness

External links
DIAMOND RIO New and Used Trucks official site - Current Brand owners/operators
Article at Trucking Info

Truck manufacturers of the United States
Defunct motor vehicle manufacturers of the United States
Motor vehicle manufacturers based in Pennsylvania
Vehicle manufacturing companies established in 1967
1967 establishments in the United States